Oni Ise Owo  is a 2007 Nigerian film.

This animated short movie is a poetic adaptation by Kenneth Shofela Coker of an African myth: The seeking of identity in hard days.

External links 

2007 films
Nigerian animated film directors
Nigerian short films